Tjejer & snubbar, also known as Tjejer & snubbar, kärringar & gubbar, was released in March 1999 and is a studio album from Swedish dansband Lotta Engbergs. The album peaked at #50 at the Swedish album chart.

The song Tjejer & snubbar, kärringar & gubbar, which is on this album and was written by Bo Fransson, entered the Swedish hitlist Svensktoppen on 8 May 1999, with the third place in the first round as best result. On 26 June 1999 the song was "knocked out" from Svensktoppen after seven rounds. The song Tjejer & snubbar, kärringar & gubbar uses a "humorist" and "happy" way to talk about getting older. A children's choir was used in the refrains of that song. The album reached the 50th place at the Swedish album chart.

Track listing

Chart positions

References

1999 albums